The 2009 Portimão Superbike World Championship round was the last round of the 2009 Superbike World Championship. It took place on the weekend of October 23–25, 2009 at the Autódromo Internacional do Algarve.

Results

Superbike race 1 classification

Superbike race 2 classification

Supersport race classification

References
 Superbike Race 1
 Superbike Race 2
 Supersport Race

Portimao Round
Portimao Superbike